Chesmenka is a rural locality (a selo) and the administrative center of Chesmenskoye Rural Settlement, Bobrovsky District, Voronezh Oblast, Russia. The population was 1,112 as of 2010. There are 11 streets.

Geography 
Chesmenka is located 29 km northeast of Bobrov (the district's administrative centre) by road. Beryozovka is the nearest rural locality.

References 

Rural localities in Bobrovsky District